John Sloane Barnes (August 30, 1855 – September 15, 1929) was a Minor League Baseball manager, athlete, promoter, and proponent of physical fitness.

Born in Ireland, Barnes organized the Pacific Northwest League in 1890, the first professional baseball league in the region. In that same year, he led the Spokane team to the Pacific Northwest League pennant.  After managing the Portland Webfeet in 1892, he played a key role in the reorganization of the Western League, which later became the American League, before devoting a decade to the promotion of physical fitness in China. In 1909, Barnes returned to manage the Butte Miners in Montana, and in 1915 operated the Aberdeen Black Cats franchise. Barnes is interred at Evergreen Washelli Memorial Park in Seattle, Washington.

Career

References

1855 births
1929 deaths
Portland Webfeet players
Minor league baseball managers
Irish emigrants to the United States (before 1923)